Terra Nova (literally "New Earth" or "New Land") may refer to:

Places

Antarctica
 Terra Nova Bay, Victoria Land
 Terra Nova Islands, a pair of small phantom islands near Antarctica
 Mount Terra Nova, a snow-covered mountain (2,130 m)

Brazil
 Terra Nova, Bahia, a municipality in Bahia
 Terra Nova, Pernambuco, a municipality in Pernambuco
 Terra Nova do Norte, a municipality in Mato Grosso
 Terra Nova River (Pernambuco), a river of Pernambuco

Canada
 Newfoundland and Labrador, a province
 Newfoundland (island), the island portion of the province of Newfoundland and Labrador, originally called Terra Nova in Portuguese
 Terra Nova (electoral district), Newfoundland and Labrador
 Terra Nova, Newfoundland and Labrador, a town in Newfoundland and Labrador
 Terra Nova National Park, a national park in Newfoundland
 Terra Nova River, a Newfoundland river
 Terra Nova oil field, an oil field development project 350 kilometres off the coast of Newfoundland
 Terra Nova, Nova Scotia, a community on Cape Breton Island
 Terra Nova, Ontario, a hamlet in Mulmur community

Italy
 Terranova di Sicilia, name used until 1927 for the municipality of Gela (CL), Sicily
 Terranova Pausania, name used until 1939 for the municipality of Olbia (OT), Sardinia
 Terranuova Bracciolini, municipality in the Province of Arezzo, Tuscany
 Terranova da Sibari, municipality in the Province of di Cosenza, Calabria
 Terranova dei Passerini, municipality in the Province of Lodi, Lombardy
 Terranova di Pollino, municipality in the Province of Potenza, Basilicata
 Terranova Sappo Minulio, municipality in the Province of Reggio Calabria, Calabria
 Terranova (Sicignano degli Alburni), hamlet in the municipality of Sicignano degli Albruni (SA), Campania

Puerto Rico
 Terranova, Quebradillas, Puerto Rico, a barrio of Puerto Rico

Education
 Terra Nova School, a prep school in Cheshire, England
 Terra Nova High School (disambiguation), several schools
 TerraNova (test), a K–12 achievement test in the United States

Seafaring
 HMCS Terra Nova (DDE 259), a Canadian Restigouche-class destroyer escort
 Terra Nova Expedition, a British expedition led by Robert Falcon Scott to Antarctica
 Terra Nova (ship), a sealing and then exploration ship, used in the Terra Nova Expedition
 Terra Nova FPSO, a floating production storage and offloading vessel in the Terra Nova oil and gas field

Taxonomy
 Gressittacantha terranova, a springtail insect that lives in the Antarctic
 Terranova (nematode), a roundworm genus of the family Anisakidae

Entertainment

Film, TV shows and theatre
 Terra Nova (TV series), a 2011 American science fiction series
 Terra Nova (1932 film), a 1932 Dutch documentary film
 Terra Nova (1991 film), a 1991 Italian film
 Terra Nova (1998 film), a 1998 Australian film
 Terra Nova (2008 film), a 2008 Russian film
 "Terra Nova" (Star Trek: Enterprise), first-season episode of Star Trek: Enterprise
 Terra Nova Theatre Group, a theatre company in Pittsburgh, Pennsylvania
 Terra Nova, a play by Ted Tally
 Terra Nova, a planet on the first-season episode Matter of Life and Death (Space: 1999)
 Terranova (TV), a German television channel

Music
 Terranova (band), a German electronic group
 Terra Nova (EP), the debut extended play by The Austerity Program
 "Terra Nova", a song written by James Taylor and Carly Simon, on James Taylor's album JT

Games and films
 Terra Nova (blog), a collaborative blog covering academic research in gaming
 Terra Nova: Strike Force Centauri, a 1996 computer game
 Nova Terra, a fictional character in the StarCraft series and Heroes of the Storm
 Terra Nova (TV series), an American science fiction drama television series

Fictional locations
 CMS Terra Nova, a supply ship owned by SCAF 200 years ago in the Dead Space 3 Awakened game
 Terra Nova, an Earth-colonized planet and the setting of the Heavy Gear series of games
 Terra Nova, one of the first Earth-colonized planets in the fictional Star Trek universe featured in the Star Trek: Enterprise episode of the same name
 Terra Nova, one of the first planets discovered by the Alphans, after the breakaway with the Earth, featured in the Space: 1999 episode "Matter of Life and Death"
 Terra Nova, a fictional colony of humans set 85 million years in the past in the TV series Terra Nova

Other uses
 Terra Nova (journal), an earth science journal
 Terra Nova (newspaper), a weekly newspaper for the island of São Vicente in Cabo Verde
 Terranova (surname)
 Terra Nova (think tank), France
 Terra Nova Equipment, a British outdoor equipment company based in Derbyshire
 Terra Nova, a Romanian diesel locomotive built by Electroputere VFU since 2014

See also
 Terre-Neuve (disambiguation)
 Tierra Nueva (disambiguation)